Trust It is the fifth studio album by the Italian house music producer Vito Lucente under the stage name Junior Jack, released on 9 February 2004 by PIAS Recordings, Noise Traxx and Nettwerk America. It is his first album to use the Junior Jack name.

Track listing

The CD version of the album features a hidden track. The track can be heard by playing the beginning of track one and then using the rewind/search button to go back 1:52.

Samples
"Stupidisco", contains a sample in the 1985 song by the Pointer Sisters, "Dare Me".

"Luv 2 U", contains a chorus sample in the 1974 song cover by Roberta Flack, "Feel Like Makin' Love". The original version of "Feel Like Makin' Love" is written by Eugene McDaniels.

"Da Hype", contains a sample in the 1982 song by Bobby Orlando, "I'm So Hot for You".

"E-Samba" contains a sample in a 1967 song by Jadir DeCastro, "Negra Sin Sandalia" (Negra Sem Sandalia).

"The Roots" contains a sample from a 1975 song by Donald Byrd,  "Change" (Makes You Want to Hustle).

"Alone" contains a sample in the 1999 song by Ginuwine, "Same Ol' G"

"It Must Be Darkness" contains a sample from a 1981 song by Blue Feather, "It's Love".

Charts

References

2004 albums
Junior Jack albums